Chae-yeon Lee (born Lee Jin-Sook (Hanja: 李珍淑); December 10, 1978), best-known mononymously as Chae Yeon, is a Korean pop singer who rose to fame with her hit single "Two of Us" in 2004.

Career

Beginning of career 
Lee originally began her career in Japan as part of (ブランニュービスケット), debuting in Japan on January 1, 2001, as part of a six-member lineup. Brand New Biscuits included also another Korean singer, Yuny Han.

Having passed an audition held by an entertainment management company in Japan, Lee first appeared on a show called  (ウッチャンナンチャンのウリナリ!!) on Japanese NTV. She appeared on the show for almost three years. Along with the television show, she performed as a singer, releasing three singles and one mini-album in Japan.

Pursuing career as an entertainer in Korea 

She returned to Korea with her first official album It's My Time under her new stage name, Chae Yeon. Initially, she was simply viewed as yet another "sexy concept" singer, as many female singers were at that time. Her debut song "위험한 연출" ("Dangerous Presentation") did well, but her real success came when her second album released late in 2004. "Two of Us (둘이서)", the lead single, pushed her to No.1 on many music charts in the spring of 2005. The music video for "Two of Us" was controversial for being too "racy" in conservative Korea, as it contained scenes showing her full back and exposed underwear. Subsequently, the video was banned on television, and the airing time was limited to after 10:00 p.m. on some cable channels. Becoming heavily played on radio, the song became so popular that a signature move from the choreographed dance became known as the "Na-na-na" dance, named after the hook of the song. It managed to hit the top of various music charts in Korea. The follow-up single "Come to Me (다가와)" was released soon after and was also popular, riding on the wave of its predecessor.

She returned after a brief break to release her third album III, which came in the fall of 2005. The first single, "오직 너", fared poorly on the charts. The record company then quickly switched to the "Disco Mix" of the song, which helped sustain its life on the charts, although not by much. The second single, "Third Love (세번째 사랑)", also fared poorly. However, this can be attributed to the fade of sexy R&B music in Korea at the time, as ballads were once again the style of choice for Korean singers.

Lee has continually participated in variety shows such as SBS's X-Man and Love Letter. She ended her official schedule with her last X-Man episode on September 25, 2005, to concentrate on recording her fourth album.

Although briefly hospitalised due to exhaustion, she made her comeback at the end of March 2006. Her lead single from her fourth album was "My Love", which was a Latin-tinged dance song. The single was extensively performed, with a remix promoted from May onwards; she then followed up with "Clumsy Love". The album sold 12,346 copies in 2007, placing 68th for the year. She continued to remain a "sexy" singer, saying that she does not mind the label.

In addition to promoting her album, Lee joined the cast of Hi-Five, part of KBS's Happy Sunday line-up. On the reality-variety show, which also starred Hyun Young, the stars attempted to succeed in various tasks, including starring in a musical, becoming flight attendants, and performing action movie stunts. She remained a part of the show until its cancellation in 2008.

Later that year, she drew media attention with her investment into, and direct involvement with Bequem, a fashion company. She is a spokesperson for the brand, promoting its stylized caps and bags. Moreover, her portfolio with a sexy "Party" concept hit record sales by mixing her sexy image with feminine touches.

The singer came back after a two-year hiatus from the music world with her mini-album Shake. Continuing to stay within the "sexy singer" concept, the lead single "Shake (Heundeullyeo)" is an electronic dance song. The music video was labelled by major networks to be unfit for broadcast without parental advisory warnings.

On December 8, 2009, Lee had her first live mini concert in China. She performed her songs to a sold-out crowd.

On July 22, 2010, Lee made her comeback on M! Countdown. She performed "Crazy" and "Look Look Look" from her new album. It was well received by fans. She continued to perform on various music programs and promote her album. Her second mini album "Look at" was released on July 29, 2010.

She has stated that although she felt awkward and uncomfortable with her sexy image initially, she feels more at ease now, and has stated that she feels sexier the more she relaxes.

In 2015, after a five-year hiatus, Lee made a comeback with the single "Obvious".

On October 17, 2016, she signed with A9 media. She had been promoting mostly in China for a while, so through this label, Lee began promoting actively in Korea through variety shows, dramas, and musicals.

In 2018, she made a comeback with the single "Bazzaya".

On August 20, 2019, her agency Cai Entertainment announced that she will be releasing a new song monthly until December. Her new single "Empty Heart (텅텅빈맘)" was released on August 20, 2019. On September 10, 2019, she released the single "Fly High".

On June 1, 2020, Lee released the single "Pink Monster (핑크몬스터)".

On October 18, 2021, after a three-year hiatus, Lee made a comeback with the ballad single "Sometimes I Cry".

Personal life 

Lee was born in Seoul on December 10, 1978. She is a graduate of the Department of Broadcasting & Entertainment, Seoul Arts College. Her family consists of her parents and her older brother.

Discography

Studio albums

Compilation albums

Extended plays

Singles 

Notes

Endorsements 
D&G [Fashion Wear]
Elle Korea
Jinro Soju
DnShop [Fashion Wear, Cosmetic Products]
Make Up For Ever [Make-up Cosmetic]
ChocoGem [Handmade Accessory]

Awards

Mnet Asian Music Awards

References

External links 

  (archive)
 Online Star Focus Chae Yeon (Arirang)
 Teen (Korea) Times Interview on February 24, 2005
 Star Interview earlier in Chae Yeon's career

1978 births
K-pop singers
Living people
People from Seoul
South Korean female idols
South Korean women pop singers
Mandarin-language singers of South Korea
21st-century South Korean singers
21st-century South Korean women singers